Placodiscus pseudostipularis is a species of plant in the family Sapindaceae. It is found in Ivory Coast, Ghana, Liberia, and Sierra Leone. It is threatened by habitat loss.

References

pseudostipularis
Endangered plants
Taxonomy articles created by Polbot